This is a list of TCU Horned Frogs football players in the NFL Draft.

Key

Selections

Notable undrafted players
Note: No drafts held before 1936

References

TCU

TCU Horned Frogs NFL Draft